Dzyanis Yur'evich Kowba (Denis Yuriyevich Kovba; 6 September 1979 – 18 November 2021) was a Belarusian professional footballer who played as a defensive midfielder. He was a member of Belarus national team between 2002 and 2007.

Death
Kowba died on 18 November 2021, aged 42, from complications of COVID-19 amid the COVID-19 pandemic in Russia.

International goals
Scores and results list Belarus' goal tally first, score column indicates score after each Kowba goal.

Honours
Sparta Prague
Czech First League: 2009–10

References

External links
 

1979 births
2021 deaths
Sportspeople from Vitebsk
Belarusian footballers
Association football midfielders
Belarus international footballers
Belarus under-21 international footballers
Russian Premier League players
Ukrainian Premier League players
Czech First League players
FC Lokomotiv Vitebsk (defunct) players
FC Zirka Kropyvnytskyi players
FC Zirka-2 Kirovohrad players
PFC Krylia Sovetov Samara players
AC Sparta Prague players
FC Oleksandriya players
FC Khimki players
Belarusian football managers
Belarusian expatriate footballers
Expatriate footballers in Russia
Belarusian expatriate sportspeople in Ukraine
Expatriate footballers in Ukraine
Expatriate footballers in the Czech Republic
Ukrainian Second League players
Deaths from the COVID-19 pandemic in Russia